Vaiyapuri Gopalsamy, better known as Vaiko, is an Indian politician. He is a member of the Rajya Sabha, the upper house of the Parliament of India from Tamil Nadu. He is the founder and General Secretary of the Marumalarchi Dravida Munnetra Kazhagam (MDMK), a political party active mainly in the Indian state of Tamil Nadu. He was earlier elected to the Lok Sabha, the lower house of the Parliament of India from Sivakasi, Tamil Nadu.

Birth
Vaiko was born in Kalingapatty near Sankarankovil, Madras Presidency.

Education
He graduated with a Gold Medal in his Bachelor of arts degree in economics from St. Xavier's College, Palayamkottai and masters from Presidency College, Chennai. He obtained his bachelor's degree in law from Madras Law College. He is an avid reader and orator known for his oratory skills both in Tamil and English. He has two daughters and a son.

Political career
Vaiko is now the general secretary of the MDMK party. Vaiko was a part of Dravida Munnetra Kazhagam (DMK) and was formerly seen as the ideological protege of former Chief Minister of Tamil Nadu, Kalaignar M. Karunanidhi. Vaiko was detained for more than a year in 1976-77 during the Emergency and for 40 days on charges of organising black flag demonstration against former Prime Minister Indira Gandhi's visit to Tamil Nadu in October 1977. He has been arrested multiple times for demonstrations especially during the 1986-87 anti Hindi agitations.

He entered the Rajya Sabha in 1978 and has been member of the Upper House for three terms. He has also been elected to the Lok Sabha twice. In 1993, Vaiko started MDMK due to differences with Karunanidhi.

Vaiko was known as "Lion Of Parliament" due to his vociferous speeches in Parliament. Vaiko protested against Kerala's demand for a new dam at Mullaperiyar and proposed building of dams in Pambar and Siruvani. Vaiko also supported national interlinking of rivers and Sethusamudram Shipping Canal Project. Vaiko filed a Public Interest Litigation (PIL) in Madras High Court requesting closure of the copper smelting plant of Sterlite Industries in Tuticorin which did not follow the waste management procedures correctly and leading to the closure of the plant.

Vaiko often goes on foot marches along with his party cadres to attract attention to issues.

Support of LTTE
Vaiko unequivocally supported LTTE and other organizations fighting for a separate Tamil Eelam country in Sri Lanka. He made a trip to Eelam 1989 at the height of the LTTE's war with Sri Lankan Army when IPKF Indian Peace Keeping Force was at Jaffna. Vaiko was the first member of Parliament and chief of a registered political party in the country to be detained under the Prevention of Terrorism Act, 2002. He was released after spending 18 months in prison.

In 2008, Criminal Investigation Department of Tamil Nadu police arrested Vaiko on charges of sedition. The charges stemmed from speeches Vaiko made at a party meeting on the Sri Lankan issue and the government's raids into LTTE-held areas on 21 October 2008. After 14 days in judicial custody, Vaiko was released.

Vaiko has said that India should retract its ban on the LTTE, claiming the ban was a shield to suppress freedom of expression and stifle the voice of the Opposition.

On 3 April 2017, Vaiko was jailed in for sedition case filed by DMK in their 2010 regime.

The Case filed against Vaiko against the Sovereignty of India. Case filed in 2009 and Vaiko served 56 days in a jail sentence. Vaiko was Sentenced To 1 Year imprisonment And 10,000 Rupees fine. Few days after the judgment Vaiko made an appeal over the judgment. On listening to Vaiko's appeal Judge Adikasevalu ordered the suspension of the sentence imposed on Vaiko.

Philanthropy
In 2005, Vaiko started the Marumalarchi Blood Donors' Club. Vaiko has launched many engagement programmes in rural areas with the participation of villagers. Vaiko has undergone a month-long padayatra in Tamil Nadu for the interlinking of interstate rivers in India. Vaiko during the time he represented Sivakasi Constituency in Loksabha conducted several medical camps for his constituents. He conducted medical camps for physically disabled people in his constituency with the help of Sri Venkateshwara Medical College, Thirupathi. Thousands of people afflicted by polio attended the camp and were given medical aid including corrective surgery at Thirupathi and Whitefield, Bengaluru and post-surgery aid, equipments, etc,. He conducted medical camps for providing the Hepatitis B vaccine for children and provided vaccines for 65000 children in his constituency. Considering the logistics and the planning involved in providing the vaccines in three doses to 65000 children, the program was successful without a hitch. And considering the fact that all these medical camps were organized by Mr. Vaiko without any government help and with his own money, it itself states the philanthropic nature of the leader.

Personal life
He married Renuka Devi on 14 June 1971. Vaiko enjoys writing in his free time and has authored over 50 books (Tamil & English) apart from regular essays and columns in newspapers.

Documentary film

Six decades of the political life of Vaiko were filmed by Durai Vaiko and released by the Chief Minister of Tamil Nadu M. K. Stalin, K. Veeramani,R. Nallakannu,K. S. Alagiri, Thol. Thirumavalavan, K. Balakrishnan (CPI-M), R Mutharasan, T. Velmurugan, Khadar Mohideen (IUML) and M H Jawahirullah (MMK) in Sathyam Cinemas.

References

|-

External links

 Official website of MDMK
Official biographical sketch in Parliament of India website

1944 births
Living people
Tamil Nadu politicians
India MPs 1998–1999
India MPs 1999–2004
Lok Sabha members from Tamil Nadu
Indian political party founders
Marumalarchi Dravida Munnetra Kazhagam politicians
Rajya Sabha members from Tamil Nadu
People from Virudhunagar district
POTA detainees
Indian Peace Keeping Force
People of the Sri Lankan Civil War